In mathematics and logic, Ackermann set theory (AST) is an axiomatic set theory proposed by Wilhelm Ackermann in 1956.

The language
AST is formulated in first-order logic. The language  of AST contains one binary relation  denoting set membership and one constant  denoting the class of all sets (Ackermann used a predicate  instead).

The axioms
The axioms of AST are the following:
 extensionality
 heredity: 
 comprehension on : for any formula  where  is not free, 

An alternative axiomatization uses the following axioms:
 extensionality
 heredity
 comprehension
 reflection: for any formula  with free variables , 
 regularity

Relation to Zermelo–Fraenkel set theory
Let  be the language of formulas that do not mention .

Therefore, AST and ZF are mutually interpretable in conservative extensions of each other. Thus they are equiconsistent.

A remarkable feature of AST is that, unlike NBG and its variants, a proper class can be an element of another proper class.

AST and category theory 
An extension of AST called ARC was developed by F.A. Muller, who stated that ARC "founds Cantorian set-theory as well as category-theory and therefore can pass as a founding theory of the whole of mathematics".

See also 
 Foundations of mathematics
 Zermelo set theory
 Alternative set theory

References

Systems of set theory